Nightsongs is an instrumental-pop studio album by Earl Klugh released in 1984. The album received a Grammy nomination for Best Pop Instrumental Performance at the 27th Grammy Awards in 1985. This release has Klugh perform "a collection of funk-free, soft melodic standards with heavy string orchestrations", featuring legendary NEA Jazz Master Jean "Toots" Thielemans on the harmonica and Grammy Award winner Don Sebesky as conductor and arranger.

Track listing 
"Ain't Misbehavin'" (Harry Brooks, Andy Razaf, Fats Waller) - 2:12
"Theme from The Pawnbroker" (Quincy Jones) - 4:13
"The Look of Love" (Jimmy Van Heusen, Sammy Cahn) - 5:28
"Nature Boy" (eden ahbez) - 3:51
"Stay Gold (Theme from The Outsiders)" (Carmine Coppola) - 2:54
"Night Song" (Earl Klugh) - 6:36
"See See Rider" (Ma Rainey) - 2:11
"A Certain Smile" (Sammy Fain, Paul Francis Webster) - 3:43
"The Shadow of Your Smile" (Johnny Mandel, Paul Francis Webster) - 5:10
"Theme from Picnic" (George Duning, Steve Allen) - 4:06

Charts

References 

1984 albums
Earl Klugh albums
Albums arranged by Don Sebesky
Capitol Records albums